Martin Forkel (born 22 July 1979) is a German football manager and former defender.

Career

Youth career
Forkel was born in Coburg. He played as a youth for two clubs in his hometown, Viktoria DJK Coburg and VfB Coburg, before joining TSV Vestenbergsgreuth. TSV merged with SpVgg Fürth in 1996, forming SpVgg Greuther Fürth, with whom Forkel would make his breakthrough in the professional game.

Southern Germany
Forkel made one appearance for SpVgg Greuther Fürth, as a substitute for Arie van Lent in a 3–1 win over FSV Mainz in the 2. Bundesliga in December 1998. He was released by the club at the end of the 1998–99 season, signing for Borussia Fulda of the Regionalliga Süd. Fulda were relegated in Forkel's only season with the club, finishing 17th, but he was to stay at the third tier, signing for Wacker Burghausen in July 2000.

In Forkel's first season with Burghausen, the club battled against relegation, but were promoted as champions in 2001–02, with Forkel and ever-present. He would go on to play for the club for four seasons in the 2. Bundesliga, achieving a mid-table finish each time, before leaving to join TuS Koblenz in July 2006.

Western Germany
Forkel made his debut for TuS Koblenz on the opening day of the 2006–07 season, as a substitute for Rüdiger Ziehl in a 2–1 defeat against MSV Duisburg. As at Burghausen, he would play for four seasons in the 2. Bundesliga, although his appearances were more restricted, and his time at Koblenz ended with the club being relegated to the 3. Liga in 2010.

Forkel then joined another 3. Liga club, 1. FC Saarbrücken, where he would spend the next two seasons as a regular in the first team. He was released by the club in 2012, and spent a year with Borussia Neunkirchen of the Oberliga Rheinland-Pfalz/Saar. In July 2013 he returned to Saarbrücken, originally to play for their reserve team, but after coach Jürgen Luginger was replaced with Milan Šašić he was brought back into the first-team fold. He made his second debut for the club in September 2013 as a substitute for Philipp Hoffmann in a 1–0 defeat to SV Darmstadt 98, and remained a first-team regular until the end of the season, which saw Saarbrücken relegated. Forkel then left the club for a second time.

International career
Forkel was in the Germany squad for the 1999 FIFA World Youth Championship, and made six appearances for the under-21 team that same year.

References

External links
 

1979 births
Living people
Association football fullbacks
German footballers
Germany under-21 international footballers
Germany youth international footballers
SpVgg Greuther Fürth players
SV Wacker Burghausen players
TuS Koblenz players
1. FC Saarbrücken players
Borussia Neunkirchen players
2. Bundesliga players
3. Liga players
People from Coburg
Sportspeople from Upper Franconia
Footballers from Bavaria